Manuchehri may refer to:
 Manuchehri, Fars
 Manuchehri, West Azerbaijan